Hallopora is an extinct genus of bryozoans of the family Halloporidae, first identified from the Lower Silurian period. They can be found in Ohio, Indiana, and Kentucky of the Midwestern United States, commonly in the Ordovician Kope Formation.

Species
Hallopora elegantula (Hall, 1852)
Hallopora baltica
Hallopora magnopora

References 

Prehistoric bryozoan genera
Ordovician bryozoans
Paleozoic animals of North America
Fossils of Georgia (U.S. state)
Bromide Formation
Paleozoic life of Ontario
Verulam Formation
Paleozoic life of the Northwest Territories
Paleozoic life of Quebec
Extinct bryozoans